Marilyn is a 2011 romantic crime drama film written and directed by Christopher Petry, starring Ryan Robbins and Allison Mack. It is based upon the true story of Paddy Mitchell, a notorious bank robber who was part of the Stopwatch Gang, who appeared on many of the top FBI most wanted lists during his tenure as a criminal. The film is noted for having been released via Distrify, a video on demand system which allows for the distributor to make money from the film via either rental or purchase.

Plot
Michael Grant (Ryan Robbins), is a paranoid and precarious criminal on the run, who regretfully takes in a twenty-year-old girl, Marilyn (Allison Mack), however, it is constantly hinted that she may be just a teenager.

Cast
Ryan Robbins as Michael Grant
Allison Mack as Marilyn
Mike Dopud as Romantic Trucker
Juan Riedinger as Motel Clerk

Only Robbins and Mack are the two cast members who receive more than a few minutes of screen time, as the other two listed are the only other cast members who appear in more than one scene, however briefly.

Reception
Through its numerous festivals, it has won the best male lead performance in the 2012 Leo Awards. It was also nominated for the best Canadian feature film in the Whistler Film Festival and was also nominated for the discovery award in the Calgary International Film Festival.

Release
After touring numerous festivals, Marilyn was finally released in 2013 via Video on Demand.

References

External links

2011 films
Romantic crime films
2010s English-language films